Melisande "Sandy" Andolong-de Leon (born Melisande Pinga Andolong; January 16, 1959) is a Filipino actress and producer, where she is mostly seen on GMA Network. She has also been currently seen on ABS-CBN TV programs.

Personal life 
Sandy Andolong was born Melisande Pinga Andolong on January 16, 1959, in North General Hospital (now José R. Reyes Memorial Medical Center), Santa Cruz, Manila.

Andolong is married to Christopher de Leon, whom she has five children Rafael, Miguel, Gabriel, Mariel, and Mica. She is also the stepmother to Lotlot, Ian, Matet, Kiko and Keneth de Leon.

Andolong has gone under quarantine after her husband tested positive to COVID-19, Her husband recovered from the disease and was released from the hospital on March 24 and have tested negative.

In March 2020, Sandy Andolong and Christopher de Leon have celebrated their 40th anniversary, the couple got married in 2001 but they have been together since 1980.

Filmography

Television

Films

Others

Awards and nominations

References

Andolong hindi na magpapa-kidney transplant

External links

1959 births
Living people
Tagalog people
Actresses from Cavite
Filipino women comedians
S
People from Manila
GMA Network personalities
ABS-CBN personalities